The discography of Argentine singer María Becerra consists of two studio album, two extended plays and 27 singles (including two as a featured artist).

In August 2021, she released her debut studio album Animal through 300 Entertainment. She has collaborated with artists such as Camila Cabello, J Balvin, Tini, Becky G, Duki, Khea, Lit Killah, Paty Cantú, among others. Becerra is known for songs like "Qué Más Pues?", "Miénteme" and "High", among others.

Albums

Studio albums

Extended plays

Singles

As a lead artist

As a featured artist

Promotional singles

Other charted songs

Guest appearances

Music videos

Notes

References

Discographies of Argentine artists
Reggaeton discographies